The Switch Tower is a 1913 American drama film featuring Lionel Barrymore and Harry Carey.

Cast
 Henry B. Walthall as The Switchman
 Claire McDowell as The Switchman's Wife
 Marion Emmons as The Switchman's Son
 Lionel Barrymore as First Counterfeiter
 Charles West as Second Counterfeiter
 John T. Dillon as Third Counterfeiter
 William A. Carroll as First Federal Agent
 Frank Evans as Second Federal Agent
 George Beranger as A Tramp
 Anthony O'Sullivan as The Storekeeper
 Harry Carey (unconfirmed)

See also
 Harry Carey filmography
 Lionel Barrymore filmography

References

External links

1913 films
1913 drama films
1913 short films
Silent American drama films
American silent short films
American black-and-white films
Films directed by Anthony O'Sullivan
1910s American films